Ghilamara is a small town situated in the far east of Lakhimpur district in Assam.

Geographical description
Situated in border of Lakhimpur and Dheamji districts; Ghilamara is a beautiful, serene, peaceful, small town in the district of Lakhimpur, Assam, India. Dhemaji is on the east, Gogamukh is on the north, Brahmaputra is on the south and the Subansiri River is on the west of Ghilamara.

Weather
As the place is situated in bank of Arunachal hill, the weather is pretty cold in the month of January and very hot in the month Jul-Aug.  The average temperature in winter season is from 5 to 20 degree Celsius (41 to 68 degree Fahrenheit) and in summer it increases to 18-36 degree Celsius (65-96.5 degree Fahrenheit). Annual rain ranges from 200 cm to 250 cm (78 to 98.5 inches).

History

This area was under the Chutia kings until the Ahoms annexed it in 1523 A.D. At least four copper plates have been recovered from the region till date which were issued by Chutia kings between 14th and 15th century. These include:
 One issued by king Satyanarayan in 1392 A.D. at Dhenukhana.
 One issued by king Satyanarayan originally in 1393 A.D. and revised by king Dharmanarayan in 1435 A.D.
 One issued by king Lakshminaryan in 1401 A.D. at Ghilamora. 
 One by king Dhirnarayan in 1522 A.D.

Etymology
There is a lack of historical data to detail the source of the name Ghilamara. Based on legends and local oral folklore, the name Ghilamara is originated with the story that revolves around Ghila, a Chutia rebel leader. The Ahom army defeated the Chutia rebels and killed Ghila in a paddy field which was named thereafter as Ghilamara field - which means Field where Ghila was killed.

Infrastructure

Healthcare
 Govt. Hospital= 1
 Primary health center=2

Veterinary
1. Veterinary hospital= 1

Water
1. No.s of tube-well= 2763
2. No.s of well=65

Road
1. Total surface road= 26 km
2. total un-surface road=65 km

Banking
1. Nationalized bank (1)

United Bank of India (UBI)

2. Gramin Bank (1)

Assam Gramin Vikash Bank

Economy
The local economy is yet in quite backward state. The major occupation is agriculture.  Road networks: people says, "it's better than before".

Once famous bird sanctuary "Bordoibam Pakshi Uddyan" is now in very pitiful shape due to lack of attention from authorities. There is an industrial training institute) building constructed in the center point of Ghilamara which is yet to start.

Educational Institution
The locales of Ghilamara have been advanced in the area of education, despite being economically backward. A good number of institutions are there starting from primary education to higher education. North Bank college had been one of the pioneer on the north bank of Brahmaputra, established in 1961. Being  the second oldest institution of higher education in the undivided Lakhimpur District, North Bank College has been rendering higher education to the ambitious youths of this backward area and facilitating for their present livelihood.

1. North Bank College
2. Ghilamara Girls College
3. Ghilamara Model Higher Secondary School
4. Ghilamara Town HS School
5. Kanta Khanikar High School
6. Ghilamara Public High School
7. Ghilamara Girls MV School
8. Ghilamara Model Lower Primary School
9. Sankardev Shishu Niketon Ghilamara
10. Ghilamara Music and Art College
11. North Bank Fine Art College
12. Ghilamara Boys' MV School
13. Ghilamara Na-Pukhuri High School
14. Dakhin Ghilamara High School
15. Ghilamara Town LP School
16. Pragati English Medium School
17. Medhabi Jatiya Bidyalaya                                           
18. Suvidya Residential School, Ghilamara                  
19. Subanshiri Valley Academy, Ghilamara

20. Ghilamara Adarsha Lower Primary School

Govt. offices
1. Lakhimpur State Road Division, (PWD), Ghilamara
2. Lakhimpur State Road Sub-Division, (PWD), Ghilamara
3. PHE Division
4. PHE Sub-Division
5. Water Resource Sub-Division
6. Subansiri Revenue Circle, Ghilamara
7. ASEB, Sub-Division
8. Seri-culture Office
9. Block Elementary Education Office
10. Ghilamara Development Block

Notes

References

Cities and towns in Lakhimpur district